Mirik College, established in 2000, is a government-run degree college in Mirik, Darjeeling district, India. It offers undergraduate courses in arts. It is affiliated to the University of North Bengal.

History
It was initiated by Mirik Citizens Committee which was established in 1972 By Mr B. B. Lama and Mr. Sagar B Subba with the objective to establish a degree college as well as to establish a Girls High School in Mirik. In 1993, During his tenure of Lal Bahadur Dewan, secretary, Citizens Committee, Mr. Jyoti Basu was advised to form a Degree college Organising Committee by Minister of State Shri Dawa Lama. This committee was constituted in February 1996. On 5 March 2000 Mr Asok Bhhatacharya the then state cabinet minister announced the constitution of Mirik College and an old dilapidated building of Agriculture Marketing Cooperative Society was provided by the District magistrate of Darjeeling for running the classes. The college was affiliated with North Bengal University.

Departments
 English
 Nepali
 History
 Geography
 Political Science

See also

References

External links
www.mirikcollege.org
University of North Bengal
University Grants Commission
National Assessment and Accreditation Council

Universities and colleges in Darjeeling district
Colleges affiliated to University of North Bengal
Educational institutions established in 2000
2000 establishments in West Bengal